The discography of Rittz, an American hip hop artist, consists of seven studio albums, thirty-one singles, two mixtapes, two extended play and thirteen music videos. His music has been released on record labels Slumerican and Strange Music.

Albums

Studio albums

Mixtapes

Extended plays

Singles

As lead artist

Guest appearances

References

Discographies of American artists
Hip hop discographies